The president of the American Samoa Senate is the presiding officer of that legislature.

List of presidents

References

Sources
Sunia, Fofō I. F. (1998). The Story of the Legislature of American Samoa: In Commemoration of the Golden Jubilee 1948-1998. Pago Pago, AS: Legislature of American Samoa. 
Various editions of The Europa World Year Book 

Senate, Presidents
 
American Samoa, Senate
American Samoa
Presidents of the American Samoan Senate